Shelbyville Historic District may refer to one of several historic districts, including:

Illinois
Shelbyville Historic District in Shelbyville, Illinois
Indiana
Shelbyville Commercial Historic District in Shelbyville, Indiana
West Side Historic District (Shelbyville, Indiana), included in National Register of Historic Places listings in Shelby County, Indiana
Kentucky
East Shelbyville District in Shelbyville, Kentucky
Shelby County Courthouse and Main Street Commercial District in Shelbyville, Kentucky
West Shelbyville District in Shelbyville, Kentucky
Tennessee
East Shelbyville Historic District in Shelbyville, Tennessee
Shelbyville Courthouse Square Historic District, Shelbyville, Tennessee

See also
 Shelbyville (disambiguation)